William Bowen (1666–1718) was a British stage actor. He was part of the United Company from 1689. For a time, he became known for his comic roles. He was fatally wounded in a duel with fellow actor James Quin in 1718.

Selected roles
 Valet in Bury Fair by Thomas Shadwell (1689)
 Whiff in The Widow Ranter by Aphra Behn (1689)
 Lignoreles in The Massacre of Paris by Nathaniel Lee (1689)
 Sancho in The Successful Strangers by William Mountfort (1690)
 Sir Gentle Golding in Sir Anthony Love by Thomas Southerne (1690)
 Coachman in The English Friar by John Crowne (1690)
 Tranio in Amphitryon by John Dryden (1690)
 Lopez in The Mistakes by Joseph Harris (1690)
 Fabion in Alphonso, King of Naples by George Powell (1690)
 Albanact in King Arthur by John Dryden (1691)
 Monsieur Le Prate in Love for Money by Thomas D'Urfey (1691)
 Monsieur Lassoil in Bussy D'Ambois by Thomas D'Urfey (1691)
 Thoughtless in Greenwich Park by William Mountfort (1691)
 Sir Timothy Kastril in The Volunteers by Thomas Shadwell (1692)
 Callow in The Marriage-Hater Matched by Thomas D'Urfey (1692)
 Sir Joseph in The Old Bachelor by William Congreve (1693)
 Cummington in The Richmond Heiress by Thomas D'Urfey (1693)
 Sir Symphony in The Maid's Last Prayer by Thomas Southerne (1693)
 Squeezewit in A Very Good Wife by George Powell (1693)
 Sir John in The Married Beau by John Crowne (1694)
 Jaqueline in The Fatal Marriage by Thomas Southerne (1694)
 Jeremy in Love for Love by William Congreve (1695)
 Sir John Aery in The She-Gallants by George Granville (1695)
 Jasper in The City Lady by Thomas Dilke (1696)
 Cheatall in The Innocent Mistress by Mary Pix (1697)
 Nickycrack in The Pretenders by Thomas Dilke (1698)
 Teague in The Twin Rivals by George Farquhar (1702)
 Monsieur de Pistolein The Old Mode and the New by Thomas d'Urfey (1703)
 Gusman in Adventures in Madrid by Mary Pix (1706)
 Captain Strut in The Double Gallant by Colley Cibber (1707)
 Truncheon in The Play is the Plot by John Durant Breval (1718)

References

Bibliography
 Highfill, Philip H, Burnim, Kalman A. & Langhans, Edward A. A Biographical Dictionary of Actors, Actresses, Musicians, Dancers, Managers, and Other Stage Personnel in London, 1660-1800: Garrick to Gyngell. SIU Press, 1978.
 Straub, Kristina, G. Anderson, Misty and O'Quinn, Daniel . The Routledge Anthology of Restoration and Eighteenth-Century Drama. Taylor & Francis,  2017.

18th-century English people
English male stage actors
British male stage actors
17th-century English male actors
18th-century English male actors
18th-century British male actors
1666 births
1718 deaths